In mathematics, the Bochner integral, named for Salomon Bochner, extends the definition of Lebesgue integral to functions that take values in a Banach space, as the limit of integrals of simple functions.

Definition 
Let  be a measure space, and  be a Banach space.  The Bochner integral of a function  is defined in much the same way as the Lebesgue integral.  First, define a simple function to be any finite sum of the form

exactly as it is for the ordinary Lebesgue integral.

A measurable function  is Bochner integrable if there exists a sequence of integrable simple functions  such that

where the integral on the left-hand side is an ordinary Lebesgue integral.

In this case, the Bochner integral is defined by

It can be shown that the sequence  is a Cauchy sequence in the Banach space  hence the limit on the right exists; furthermore, the limit is independent of the approximating sequence of simple functions  These remarks show that the integral is well-defined (i.e independent of any choices). It can be shown that a function is Bochner integrable if and only if it lies in the Bochner space

Properties

Elementary properties 

Many of the familiar properties of the Lebesgue integral continue to hold for the Bochner integral.  Particularly useful is Bochner's criterion for integrability, which states that if  is a measure space, then a Bochner-measurable function  is Bochner integrable if and only if

Equivalently,  is the limit -almost everywhere of a sequence of countably-valued simple functions.

Linear operators 

for all measurable subsets .

A non-trivially stronger form of this result, known as Hille's theorem, also holds for closed operators.

for all measurable subsets .

Dominated convergence theorem 

A version of the dominated convergence theorem also holds for the Bochner integral.  Specifically, if  is a sequence of measurable functions on a complete measure space tending almost everywhere to a limit function , and if

for all .

If  is Bochner integrable, then the inequality

holds for all   In particular, the set function

Radon–Nikodym property 
An important fact about the Bochner integral is that the Radon–Nikodym theorem  to hold in general, and instead is a property (the Radon–Nikodym property) defining an important class of nice Banach spaces.  

for every measurable set   

The Banach space  has the Radon–Nikodym property if  has the Radon–Nikodym property with respect to every finite measure.   Equivalent formulations include: 
 Bounded discrete-time martingales in  converge a.s.  
 Functions of bounded-variation into  are differentiable a.e.
 For every bounded , there exists  and  such that  has arbitrarily small diameter.  

Spaces with Radon–Nikodym property include separable dual spaces (this is the Dunford–Pettis theorem) and reflexive spaces, which include, in particular, Hilbert spaces.

See also

References 

 
 
 
 
 
 
 
 
 
 

Definitions of mathematical integration
Integral representations
Topological vector spaces